La Paz is a city in the province of Entre Ríos in the Argentine Mesopotamia.

The city lies in the north-west of the province, on the left-hand (eastern) shore of the Paraná River. It was already settled in the 18th century as a natural port, appearing in maps of the time as Cabayú Cuatiá (the name of a stream that empties into the Paraná at this point). It formally became a city on 1 January 1873.

Like other cities in the area, La Paz has a hot springs complex and takes touristic advantage of its river beaches and the possibility of excellent sport fishing, with access to the Curuzú Chalí Provincial Fish Reserve.

References

 
 TurismoEntreRios.com - Tourism portal of the province of Entre Ríos.

Populated places in Entre Ríos Province
Paraná River
Cities in Argentina
Argentina
Entre Ríos Province